Triptych–August 1972 is a large oil on canvas triptych by the British artist Francis Bacon (1909–1992). It was painted in memory of Bacon's lover George Dyer who committed suicide on 24 October 1971, the eve of the artist's retrospective at Paris's Grand Palais, then the highest honour Bacon had received.

The work is the second of three "Black Triptychs" completed in the following years as a memorial to his lover. The dates of the last two triptychs are included in their titles, indicating that Bacon intended them as almost diary entries into a very bleak period in his life. As such the paintings are records of how Bacon was coping with the loss of Dyer at that particular time. They are haunted and permeated by the inevitable feelings of guilt experienced by anybody who has lost a close friend to suicide.

Context

Bacon never really recovered from Dyer's suicide, and never again had such a close or long standing sexual partner. He said, "people say you forget about death, but you don't. After all, I've had a very unfortunate life, because all the people I've been really fond of have died. And you don't stop thinking about them; time doesn't heal." He expanded further in the 1985 South Bank Show documentary he explained further, stating that "[people] are always trying to defeat death by leaving images, but it won't make any difference; we'll just be dead, though the image may live on".

The black triptychs are so named because of their bleak mood and due to the active role the black paint plays in each. In essence each is a memento mori, and they are part of a larger series of works painted in the aftermath, a succession of paintings that include smaller single heads of Dyer, and a number of Bacon's self-portraits that extend into the mid 80s, perhaps as far as his late masterpiece, Study for a Self-Portrait—Triptych, 1985–86. Of that work he said that people had died "around me like flies and I've had nobody else to paint but myself".

In this work Dyer is presented as a figure struggling in vain to survive; in the triptych of 1973 he is finally defeated, naked and vomiting into a toilet basin in one panel, in another wandering towards an open door to lay down and die. The panels in Triptych–August 1972 document the final hours of Dyer's life, but in common with the other two works in the series, internally the sequencing of individual panels defy narrative interpretation; they cannot be read from left to right, and any depiction is as desperate as an other.

Description

The portraits on the wing panels are based on photographs of Dyer taken by John Deakin in the mid-1960s. They are faithful to the photographs, except that the black background replaces the studio wall. They panels show Dyer in his underwear posing on a chair in the artist's studio. He is depicted as muscular and strong, but restless, ill at ease, and the two panels are filled with senses of movement and tension. Dyer is presented as literally a man falling apart. His body is mutilated; the black border dissolves into his body in both, leaving a void in place of large parts of his torso. In contrast he seems to be melting, leaving blobs of flesh on the ground beneath him. Bacon described this effect as portraying "the life flowing out of him".

The center painting shows two men having sex; presumably Bacon is remembering his encounters with his lost lover. The depiction is based on Eadweard Muybridge's series of photographs of wrestlers –a series he often referred to– but takes the idea much further, directly linking the act of love with acts of violence. Yet the panel is quite chaste; the upper man is without genitals. Art historian Denis Farr sees their embrace as without affection, and that they are more embraced in "mortal combat". The outer wings are formed from a pair of long isosceles triangles, which contrast against the low isosceles triangle of the central image. In the outer wings, the back rectangles are flanked by inwards facing off white triangles. This compositional structure may have been influenced by Matisse's Bathers by a River, which also uses geometric forms to separate three figures and create wide bands. As in all of the Black Triptych's, doorways predominate, and form a menacing and foreboding presence, symbolic of death and the void the subject is about to pass through.

As with the third triptych in the series, Triptych, May–June 1973, each panel shows a wall with a large open door behind Dyer. It is this doorway that emits the darkness, represented by black paint, that overwhelms and literally consumes the representations of Dyer, removing large parts of his flesh. In this work, Dyer in left wing has lost most of his torso, in the right wing the black removes an area of flesh reaching from his waist to his jaw. Both figures in the center panel have been eroded; and are reduced to little more than upper body and head; art critic Wieland Schmied that if the panel had been set a few moments later the black would have "swallowed [them] up entirely". Bacon first introduced this motif in his 1965 Crucifixion, however while that work was set in an open and public space, the figures in these panels are isolated and alone.

Notes

Sources

 Dawson, Barbara; Sylvester, David. Francis Bacon in Dublin. London: Thames & Hudson, 2000. 
 Farr, Dennis; Peppiatt, Michael; Yard, Sally. Francis Bacon: A Retrospective. NY: Harry N Abrams, 1999. 
 Peppiatt, Michael. Anatomy of an Enigma. Westview Press, 1996. 
 Russell, John, Francis Bacon (World of Art). London: Norton, 1971. 
 Schmied, Wieland. Francis Bacon: Commitment and Conflict. Munich: Prestel. 
 Sylvester, David. The Brutality of Fact: Interviews With Francis Bacon. London: Thames and Hudson, 1987. 
 van Alphen, Ernst. Francis Bacon and the Loss of Self. London: Reaktion Books, 1992. 
 Zweite, Armin (ed). The Violence of the Real. London: Thames and Hudson, 2006. 

1973 paintings
Paintings by Francis Bacon
Modern paintings
Triptychs